Studia theologica (in Czech and Slovak languages with English abstracts) is a peer-reviewed quarterly academic journal of theology, philosophy and church history. Since 1999, it is issued in co-operation of four Czech and Slovak theological colleges: St. Cyril and Methodius Faculty of Theology of Palacký University in Olomouc, Faculty of Theology of University of South Bohemia in České Budějovice, Catholic Theological Faculty of Charles University in Prague and Theological Faculty of University of Trnava in Bratislava.

See also 
 List of theological journals

References

External links
Studia theologica official site

Catholic theology and doctrine
Christianity studies journals
Czech philosophy
Publications established in 1999
Quarterly journals